"The Message" is a science fiction short story by American writer Isaac Asimov.  It was first published in the February 1956 issue of The Magazine of Fantasy and Science Fiction and reprinted in the 1957 collection Earth Is Room Enough.  "The Message" provides a fanciful origin of the expression "Kilroy was here". A very short story, it contains only 579 words.

Plot summary

George Kilroy, a 30th-century historian, briefly travels in time to the twentieth century to research the life of the Second World War foot soldier. He arrives in North Africa as soldiers are landing on the beaches of Oran, and before leaving, he makes his mark on the wall of a hut.

External links

Short stories by Isaac Asimov
1956 short stories
Science fiction short stories
Short fiction about time travel
Works originally published in The Magazine of Fantasy & Science Fiction
Algeria in fiction